Effie: Just Quietly was a satirical television series that screened on Australia's Special Broadcasting Service in 2001.

It featured the iconoclastic Effie, played by Mary Coustas. Effie is a suburban Greek Australian hair goddess, who naively interrogates the inherent and often ludicrous contradictions in Australians' everyday attitudes and prejudices.

The series contains six half-hour episodes. It was produced by Robyn Kershaw and directed by Warren Coleman and Shawn Seet.

See also 
 List of Australian television series

External links
Effie, Just Quietly at the National Film and Sound Archive

Special Broadcasting Service original programming
Australian comedy television series
2001 Australian television series debuts
2001 Australian television series endings